Tiny Tina may refer to:
 Tina Arena, an Australian singer, songwriter, actress, and television personality
 Tiny Tina (character), a fictional character from the Borderlands video game series